Blanca Rosalía Zumárraga Contreras (born January 6, 1981, in Córdoba, Veracruz, Mexico) competed in the national pageant Nuestra Belleza México, representing Puebla, the state in which she was raised. She received the title of Miss Mexico World and represented her country in the 2002 Miss World pageant, held on December 7, 2002.

References

Living people
Nuestra Belleza México winners
Mexican people of Basque descent
Miss World 2002 delegates
People from Puebla
1981 births